Adelaide of Austria (Adelheid Franziska Marie Rainera Elisabeth Clotilde; 3 June 1822 – 20 January 1855) was Queen of Sardinia by marriage to Victor Emmanuel II of Sardinia, future King of Italy, from 1849 until 1855 when she died as a result of gastroenteritis. She was the mother of Umberto I of Italy.

Biography

Archduchess of Austria

She was born at the Royal Palace of Milan to Archduke Rainer of Austria and his wife Princess Elisabeth of Savoy. Named Adelaide, or known as Adele in the family, she held the title of Archduchess of Austria. Her father was the Viceroy of Lombardy-Venetia.

Duchess of Savoy

On 12 April 1842, at the Palazzina di Caccia di Stupinigi, she married Victor Emmanuel of Savoy. The marriage was used to cement relations between the House of Savoy and that of the House of Habsburg but was viewed by many people of the time to increase Austrian power in Italy.

Victor Emmanuel was her paternal first cousin once removed and also her maternal first cousin as her new father-in-law was also her maternal uncle. Prince Victor Emmanuel was the heir to his father the King of Sardinia. He was styled the "Duke of Savoy" prior to succession. Adelaide thus took on the style of "Duchess of Savoy." She maintained her style of Imperial and Royal Highness until she became Queen.

Her husband's mother, Maria Theresa of Austria, retained great influence over her son throughout his life. Her mother-in-law was also her first cousin, both she and Adelaide being grandchildren of Emperor Leopold II. Adelaide and her husband of thirteen years had eight children. Four of these went on to have further progeny. Her husband had various extramarital affairs throughout the marriage. Adelaide was a quiet and pious woman and had a strict upbringing. She was a loving wife and frequently would give to charity.

Queen of Sardinia

In March 1849, her father-in-law King Charles Albert abdicated after the events of the Revolutions of 1848. Her husband succeeded as Victor Emmanuel II of Sardinia. During her tenure as queen consort, she had three further children, all of whom died in infancy. 

Queen Adelaide had no political influence, but she did on one occasion support her mother-in-law, queen dowager Maria Theresa, who had great influence over her son and who in one well known occasion tried to influence policy. When the reforms against the priviligies of the Church were introduced by the Cavour government in 1854, she united with her mother-in-law to support the latter's appeal to the king to prevent the reform with the argument that the reform was hostile against the church and thus unacceptable for a Christian. The effort was however unsuccessful.  

On 8 January 1855, she gave birth to a son who was styled the Count of Genevois. Days later, Queen Maria Theresa died on 12 January 1855. Adelaide went to the late queen's funeral on 16 January, and on returning to the palace caught a cold. She died four days later at the Royal Palace of Turin, having had an acute attack of gastroenteritis. Another story says that Adelaide died of her burns after stepping on a match that set fire to her clothes. She is buried at the Royal Basilica of Superga. In 1861 her husband would become the first post-unification King of Italy.

Issue

Princess Maria Clotilde of Savoy (2 March 1843 – 25 June 1911) married Prince Napoleon Joseph Bonaparte and had issue.
Umberto I of Italy (14 March 1844 – 29 July 1900) married Princess Margherita of Savoy and had issue.
Amadeo I of Spain (30 May 1845 – 18 January 1890) married Princess Maria Vittoria dal Pozzo and later Princess Maria Letizia Bonaparte and had issue.
 Prince Oddone of Savoy (11 July 1846 – 22 January 1866) died unmarried.
 Princess Maria Pia of Savoy (16 October 1847 – 5 July 1911) married King Luís I of Portugal and had issue.
 Prince Carlo Alberto of Savoy (2 June 1851 – 22 June 1854) Duke of Chablais, died in childhood.
 Prince Vittorio Emanuele of Savoy (6 July 1852) died at birth.
 Prince Vittorio Emanuele of Savoy (8 January 1855 – 17 May 1855) Count of Genevois, died in infancy.

Ancestry

References

External links

Sardinian queens consort
1822 births
1855 deaths
Nobility from Milan
Princesses of Savoy
House of Habsburg-Lorraine
Italian people of Polish descent
Austrian Poles
Tuscan princesses
Austrian princesses
Duchesses of Savoy
Burials at the Basilica of Superga
Victor Emmanuel II of Italy
19th-century Italian women